Spencer House is an historic town house at 27 St James's Place in the St James's area of Westminster, Greater London, England. The house is Grade I listed on the National Heritage List for England.

Early history
The house was commissioned in 1756 by John Spencer (who later became the first Earl Spencer), as he required a large townhouse in London to augment his position and status. The architect he chose was John Vardy, who had studied under William Kent. Vardy is responsible for the facades of the mansion that we see today.

In 1758, James "Athenian" Stuart, who had studied the arcadian values of Ancient Greek architecture, replaced Vardy as the architect of the project. As a direct result of this, Spencer House was to have authentic Greek details in the internal decoration, and thus it became one of the first examples in London of the neoclassical style, which was to sweep the country.

As the home of successive Earls and Countesses Spencer, the staterooms of the house became a theatre for the pageant that was London high society. Members of the Spencer family occupied the mansion continuously until 1895, when the house was let out. The Spencers returned for a brief time during the first quarter of the 20th century, after which the house was let at various times as either a club or offices. During the Blitz of the Second World War, it was stripped of its few remaining authentic treasures, specially made furniture, and fireplaces.

Recent history

Spencer House remains in the ownership of the Earls Spencer, the current freeholder being Charles Spencer, 9th Earl Spencer, brother of Diana, Princess of Wales. However, since the Second World War, the house has been continuously let out. In 1948 it was leased to Christie's auctioneers, in 1956 to the British Oxygen Company, and in 1963 to the Economist Intelligence Unit.

On 25 December 1986, RIT Capital Partners, the family company of Jacob Rothschild, 4th Baron Rothschild, secured a 96-year lease (with an additional 24-year option) with an annual rent of £85,000.

In a restoration, the state rooms and garden were returned to their original appearance. The lease of Spencer House was valued at £35 million in the 2017 annual report of RIT Capital Partners.

Together with Lancaster House, Bridgewater House, Dudley House and Apsley House, Spencer House is one of the last of the many aristocratic townhouses which once adorned central London.

References

Bibliography

Further reading
Christie Manson and Woods (2010) The Spencer House Sale: Thursday 8 July 2010: property of the Spencer collections, sold by order of the trustees.

External links

Grade I listed buildings in the City of Westminster
History of the City of Westminster
Spencer-Churchill family residences
Georgian architecture in the City of Westminster
Historic house museums in London
Houses in the City of Westminster
Museums in the City of Westminster
Rothschild family residences
St James's
Palladian Revival architecture
1766 architecture
Houses completed in 1766
St James's Place